Miriam Knee (born 19 January 1938 in Ringwood, Victoria) is an Australian former cricketer who played eight women's Test matches and six women's One Day Internationals for the Australia national women's cricket team.

References

External links
 Miriam Knee at southernstars.org.au

1938 births
Living people
Australia women Test cricketers
Australia women One Day International cricketers
Victoria cricketers
Cricketers from Melbourne
People from Ringwood, Victoria